Shastegan (also Romanized as Shaştegān; also known as Shastakān and Shastekān) is a village in Kushk-e Qazi Rural District, in the Central District of Fasa County, Fars Province, Iran. At the 2006 census, its population was 241, in 60 families.

References 

Populated places in Fasa County